Huberty is a surname. Notable people with the surname include:

Dan Huberty (born 1968), American businessman and politician
Ernst Huberty (born 1927), German sports journalist
James Huberty, perpetrator of the 1984 San Ysidro McDonald's massacre, in San Diego, U.S.

See also
Hubert